James Cheek can refer to:
James E. Cheek (1932–2010), American educator
James Richard Cheek (1936–2011), United States diplomat